Fire Within is the second studio album by English musician Birdy, released on 16 September 2013 by 14th Floor Records and Atlantic Records. It is her first album of predominantly original compositions, as her eponymous debut album consisted largely of covers. Birdy collaborated with several producers including Jim Abbiss, Rich Costey, Jake Gosling, John Hill, Ben Lovett, Eric Rosse, Fraser T Smith, Ryan Tedder, Dan Wilson and Greg Wells during its recording. The album includes the singles "Wings", "No Angel", "Light Me Up" and "Words as Weapons".

Fire Within received generally positive reviews from music critics. In North America, Fire Within was released on 3 June 2014. Prior to that, several album tracks and live versions of past songs were released as a US-only EP titled Breathe on 24 September 2013.

Background and recording

Following the commercial success of her debut album Birdy (2011), Birdy decided for her second record to be mostly of original compositions instead of covering songs like in her previous album. She noted that she began writing songs at age of eight, and considers this album "very special" for her. She also talked about her experience as a songwriter: "A lot of people thought [she couldn't write] but then it was good doing it by stealth so I could develop my own writing and have time to work on it."

For Fire Within Birdy worked with various musicians during its recording including Ryan Tedder, Dan Wilson, Rich Costey, Ben Lovett from the British folk rock band Mumford & Sons, Tim Commerford from American rock band Rage Against the Machine, Paul Jackson Jr. and Omar Hakim. She released a preview of the recording of the album through YouTube alongside the album's release date. Birdy cited the changes of routine and relationships she had after her breakthrough work as a primarily influence for the album.

Critical reception

Fire Within received generally positive reviews from music critics. At Metacritic, which assigns a weighted mean rating out of 100 to reviews from mainstream critics, the album received an average score of 66, based on seven reviews, which indicates "generally favorable reviews".

Track listing

Notes
  signifies an additional producer.
  signifies a strings producer.

Charts

Weekly charts

Year-end charts

Certifications

Notes

References

External links
 
 

2013 albums
Albums produced by Dan Wilson (musician)
Albums produced by Fraser T. Smith
Albums produced by Greg Wells
Albums produced by Jake Gosling
Albums produced by Jim Abbiss
Albums produced by Ryan Tedder
Atlantic Records albums
Birdy (singer) albums